Manurewa is a local government area in Auckland, in New Zealand's Auckland Region. It is governed by the Manurewa Local Board and Auckland Council. It is within the council's Manurewa-Papakura Ward.

Geography

The area includes a mixture of hills and Manukau Harbour coastline.

It incorporates both the main suburb of Manurewa. and the surrounding suburbs of Manukau Heights, Totara Heights, Hillpark, Randwick Park, The Gardens, Alfriston, Wattle Downs, Weymouth, Clendon Park, Homai and Wiri.

Features

There is an extensive range of shops along Great South Road, including Southmall Manurewa.

The Wiri industrial park is a major employment centre.

Other features of the area include Auckland Botanic Gardens, Manurewa Aquatic Centre and the Randwick Park.

References